Sir Charles Carteret, 3rd Baronet (4 June 1679 – 6 June May 1715) was Seigneur of Sark from 1693 to 1715.

References

1679 births
1715 deaths
People from Sark
Charles de Carteret
Baronets in the Baronetage of England